The 19411 / 12 Intercity Express is an Express  train belonging to Indian Railways Western Railway zone that runs between  in (Ahmedabad) and  in India.

Coaches
The 19411 / 12 Intercity Express has one AC chair car, 11 general unreserved & two SLR (seating with luggage rake) coaches. It does not carry a pantry car coach.

As is customary with most train services in India, coach composition may be amended at the discretion of Indian Railways depending on demand.

Service

Routing

Traction
As the route is going to be electrified, a  based WDM-3A electric locomotive pulls the train to its destination.

References

External links
19411 Intercity Express at India Rail Info
19412 Intercity Express at India Rail Info

Intercity Express (Indian Railways) trains
Transport in Ahmedabad
Rail transport in Gujarat
Rail transport in Rajasthan
Transport in Ajmer